The Welland River (originally called the Chippawa Creek) is a river in the Golden Horseshoe that passes through the Southern Ontario cities of Welland and Niagara Falls. It flows from its source just south of Hamilton, Ontario to meet the Niagara River.

History

The river was originally called the Chippawa Creek since it drained into the Niagara River at Chippawa. Like many other places in Niagara, it was renamed by John Graves Simcoe, the first lieutenant governor of Upper Canada in 1792. The present name was taken from the river of the same name in Lincolnshire, Eastern England. The Welland River is occasionally referred to as Chippawa Creek, especially by those in the Chippawa area itself.

The Welland Canal was named after the river since it originally was planned to link Lake Ontario to Welland River. The city of Welland was later named after both waterways which crossed in the city.

O'Reilly's Bridge

The settler, Patrick O'Reilly, son of Sgt. John Reilly, of Stamford Township (present-day Niagara Falls), settled in Wainfleet in 1806. After meeting Sarah, the daughter of John Brown of Pelham Township, Patrick O'Reilly felled a couple of very tall trees across the River to shorten his journey to see her. A better bridge was built after they married and Patrick realized Sarah was frightened of walking along the logs. John Brown O'Reilly was their son who acted as Clerk of Wainfleet Township for many years. Over the years O'Reilly's Bridge saw many upgrades and improvements until it finally became the responsibility of the municipality. That is about the time O'Reilly's Bridge became a single-lane iron truss bridge, the only of its kind on the entire river, and one of the oldest iron truss bridges in Southern Ontario.

Geography

The river flows under two navigable aqueducts: the Welland Recreational Waterway and the new alignment of the Welland Canal. An important tributary of the river is Coyle Creek, a picturesque and thickly forested creek that flows into the river on the north bank.

A stream of the river branches off shortly before its mouth. This canal quickly turns an open-cut hydropower channel through the city of Niagara Falls on its way to the Sir Adam Beck Hydroelectric Generating Stations in Queenston.

The International Control Dam, a weir in the Niagara River, causes the Welland River to reverse its direction twice a day when the flow of water over the Niagara Falls is reduced overnight and the water heads back up the river as far back as Wellandport. When the water flow is restored, the water direction of the Welland River changes once again to flow towards the Niagara River.

See also
List of rivers of Ontario

References

External links
Niagara Peninsula Conservation Authority

Rivers of the Regional Municipality of Niagara
Welland